Kapalleki  is a village development committee in Doti District in the Seti Zone of western Nepal. At the time of the 2011 Nepal census it had a population of 4049.

References

External links
UN map of the municipalities of Doti District

Populated places in Doti District